Pseudeutropius mitchelli is an endangered species of freshwater fishes endemic to Kerala, India that belongs to the family of Schilbid catfishes. It is known as Malabar patashi.

Distribution
Pseudeutropius mitchelli is endemic to the rivers of Kerala, part of Western Ghats. Known from the middle reaches of the Chaliyar, Bharatapuzha, Chalakudy River, Periyar River, and Achenkovil.

Description
A species of Pseudeutropius with head 4.7–5.1 in SL; eye diameter 3.0–3.5 in head; mouth terminal, upper jaw slightly longer than lower jaw; teeth villiform, in bands on jaws; vomero-palatine in two distinct, small, oval patches; 4 pairs of barbels; maxillary barbels extend to middle of pelvic fins; dorsal fin inserted anterior to pelvic fins.

References

Schilbeidae
Fish of Asia
Fish described in 1864